The Fitzhugh is a weekly newspaper serving the Jasper, Alberta area.

The Fitzhugh formerly billed itself as Jasper's independent, locally owned newspaper. It was started in 2005 by a group of five colleagues from Jasper. In 2012 it was sold to Aberdeen Publishing Limited Partnership, comprising a stable of newspapers which is based in British Columbia, so it is no longer locally owned nor truly independent. It is distributed free on Thursdays  in Jasper, Hinton and Valemount, B.C.

The paper's name comes from what the town of Jasper was once called, Fitzhugh, named after the general manager and vice president of the Grand Trunk Pacific Railway. The town's name was changed to Jasper in 1913.

The Fitzhugh became the only community paper serving Jasper when the Jasper Booster closed. The Booster printed its last issue on March 11, 2009.

See also
List of newspapers in Canada

References

External links
The Fitzhugh official site

Weekly newspapers published in Alberta
Publications established in 2005
Jasper, Alberta